The Rural Municipality of Antelope Park No. 322 is a rural municipality (RM) in the Canadian province of Saskatchewan within Census Division No. 13 and  Division No. 6. It is located along the border with Alberta.

History 
The RM of Antelope Park No. 322 incorporated as a rural municipality on December 11, 1911. It was named for the ubiquitous pronghorn antelope.

Geography

Communities and localities 
The following unincorporated communities are within the RM.

Localities
Court
Fusilier
Hoosier
Loverna, (dissolved March 10, 2003)

Demographics 

Attractions 
 Great Wall of Saskatchewan, near Smiley
 Buffalo Rubbing Stone Provincial Historic Site, near Flaxcombe
 Hoosier United Church, in Hoosier, Saskatchewan

Government 
The RM of Antelope Park No. 322 is governed by an elected municipal council and an appointed administrator that meets on the third Tuesday of every month. The reeve of the RM is Gordon Dommett while its administrator is Robin Busby. The RM's office is located in Marengo.

Transportation 
Rail
 Boundary Branch C.N.R abandoned in 1981—once served Millerdale, Beaufield, Coleville, Driver, Smiley, Dewar Lake, Hoosier, Greene, Loverna

Roads
 Highway 317—serves Fusilier (north to Primate) to Hoosier
 Highway 772—serves Loverna
 Highway 51—serves Fusilier to Alberta

See also 
List of rural municipalities in Saskatchewan

References 

A

Division No. 13, Saskatchewan